Bill Murray (9 November 1904 in Alexandria, Scotland – 1940) was a Scottish footballer who played as a defender.

External links
 LFC History profile

1904 births
Date of death unknown
Scottish footballers
Liverpool F.C. players
Vale of Clyde F.C. players
Clydebank F.C. (1914) players
New Brighton A.F.C. players
Barrow A.F.C. players
Bristol Rovers F.C. players
Folkestone F.C. players
Association football defenders
1940 deaths